Kv channel interacting proteins are members of a family of voltage-gated potassium (Kv) channel-interacting proteins (KCNIPs, also frequently called "KChIP"), which belong to the recoverin branch of the EF-hand superfamily. Members of the KCNIP family are small calcium binding proteins. They all have EF-hand-like domains, and differ from each other in the N-terminus. They are integral subunit components of native Kv4 channel complexes. They may regulate A-type currents, and hence neuronal excitability, in response to changes in intracellular calcium. Alternative splicing results in multiple transcript variant encoding different isoforms.

Members of this family include:
 KCNIP1, a protein that in humans is encoded by the KCNIP1 gene.
 KCNIP2, a protein that in humans is encoded by the KCNIP2 gene.
 KCNIP3, more commonly known as Calsenilin, a protein that in humans is encoded by the KCNIP3 gene.
 KCNIP4, a protein that in humans is encoded by the KCNIP4 gene.

References

EF-hand-containing proteins